In addition to the televised episodes of Doctor Who starring Jon Pertwee, the Third Doctor has appeared in a number of spin-off media.

Stage play
Doctor Who – The Ultimate Adventure

Radio
The Paradise of Death
The Ghosts of N-Space

Audio books
Freedom
Degrees of Truth

Audio dramas
Zagreus (cameo appearance) (1999)
The Blue Tooth (adventure related by the character Liz Shaw) (2007)
Old Soldiers (adventure related by the character Brigadier Lethbridge-Stewart) (2007)
The Doll of Death (adventure related by the character Jo Grant) (2008)
The Magician's Oath (adventure related by the character Mike Yates) (2009)
The Prisoner of Peladon (adventure related by the King of Peladon) (2009)
Shadow of the Past (adventure related by the character Liz Shaw) (2010)
The Time Vampire (adventure related by the character Leela) (cameo appearance) (2010)
Find and Replace (adventure related by the characters  Jo Grant & Iris Wildthyme) (2010)
The Sentinels of the New Dawn (adventure related by the character Liz Shaw) (2011)
Tales from the Vault (short adventure related by the character Jo Grant) (2011)
The Mists of Time (adventure related by the character Jo Grant) *free download with Doctor Who Magazine # 411 (2011)
The Three Companions (adventure related by the character Brigadier Lethbridge-Stewart) (2011)
The Many Deaths of Jo Grant (adventure related by the character Jo Grant) (2011)
Binary (adventure related by the character Liz Shaw) (2012)
The Rings of Ikiria (adventure related by the character Mike Yates) (2012)
The Last Post (adventure related by the character Liz Shaw) (2012)
Destiny of the Doctor: Vengeance of the Stones (adventure related by the character Mike Yates) (2013)
The Schorchies (adventure related by the character Jo Grant) (2013)
Council of War (adventure related by the character Sergeant Benton) (2013)
Ghost in the Machine (adventure related by the character Jo Grant) (2013)
The Light at the End (cameo appearance) (2013)
The Mega (adventure related by the characters  Jo Grant & Mike Yates) (2013)
Doctor Who: The Third Doctor Adventures Volume 1 (adventures related by the characters Jo Grant & Mike Yates) (2015)
Prisoners of the Lake
The Havoc of Empires
Doctor Who: The Third Doctor Adventures Volume 2 (adventures related by the character Jo Grant) (2016)
The Transcendence of Ephros
The Hidden Realm
Doctor Who: The Third Doctor Adventures Volume 3 (adventures related by the character Jo Grant) (2017)
The Conquest of Fear
Storm of the Horofax
Doctor Who: The Third Doctor Adventures Volume 4 (adventures related by the character Jo Grant) (2017)
The Rise of the New Humans
The Tyrants of Logic

Short Trips audios
A True Gentleman
Walls of Confinement
Seven to One
Pop Up
Lost in the Wakefield Triangle
Time Tunnel
The Other Woman
The Blame Game
Gardeners World
Landbound

Subscriber Short Trips
The Switching
Neptune
A Home From Home
Sphinx Lightning
The Christmas Dimension

Unbound alternative Third Doctors
David Warner
Sympathy for the Devil
Masters of War
The New Adventures of Bernice Summerfield: The Unbound Universe
The New Adventures of Bernice Summerfield: The Ruler of the Universe
Arabella Weir
Exile

Novels and short stories

BBC Books original
The Face of the Enemy by David A. McIntee
Harvest of Time by Alastair Reynolds

Virgin New Adventures
Timewyrm: Genesys by John Peel (The Seventh Doctor briefly allows the Third's personality to take control of him)
Timewyrm: Revelation by Paul Cornell (Appears in the Doctor's mind)
All-Consuming Fire by Andy Lane (cameo appearance)

Virgin Missing Adventures
State of Change by Christopher Bulis (The Sixth Doctor allows the Third's personality to take control for a time)
The Ghosts of N-Space by Barry Letts
Dancing the Code by Paul Leonard
The Eye of the Giant by Christopher Bulis
The Scales of Injustice by Gary Russell
Speed of Flight by Paul Leonard

Past Doctor Adventures
The Devil Goblins from Neptune by Martin Day and Keith Topping
Catastrophea by Terrance Dicks
The Wages of Sin by David A. McIntee
Last of the Gaderene by Mark Gatiss
Verdigris by Paul Magrs
The Quantum Archangel by Craig Hinton (Alternate version; appears in an alternate timeline with the Sixth Doctor's companion Melanie Bush)
Rags by Mick Lewis
Amorality Tale by David Bishop
The Suns of Caresh by Paul Saint
Deadly Reunion by Terrance Dicks and Barry Letts
Island of Death by Barry Letts

Eighth Doctor Adventures
The Eight Doctors by Terrance Dicks
Alien Bodies by Lawrence Miles (appears in the prologue)
Interference: Books One and Two by Lawrence Miles (History altered to cause him to regenerate ahead of schedule)
The Ancestor Cell by Peter Anghelides and Stephen Cole (Appears as a 'ghost' within the TARDIS due to his altered regeneration)
Seen in the TARDIS mirror in Camera Obscura

Telos Doctor Who novellas
 Nightdreamers by Tom Arden

Penguin Fiftieth Anniversary eBook novellas
 The Spear of Destiny by Marcus Sedgwick

Comics

TV Comic
The Arkwood Experiments
The Multi-Mobile
Insect
The Metal Eaters
The Fishmen of Carpantha
Doctor Who and the Rocks from Venus
Doctor Who and the Robot
Trial by Fire
The Kingdom Builders
Children of the Evil Eye (1 Sep 1973)
Nova (13 Oct 1973)
The Amateur (15 Dec 1973)
The Disintegrator (2 Feb 1974)
Is Anyone There? (9 Mar 1974)
Size Control (18 May 1974)
The Magician (6 Jul 1974)
The Metal Eaters (24 Aug 1974)
Lords of the Ether (12 Oct 1974)
The Wanderers (7 Dec 1974)

TV Comic Specials
Assassin From Space
Undercover

TV Comic Annuals
Castaway
Levitation	
Petrified

TV Action
Gemini Plan			
Timebenders				 	
The Vogan Slaves
The Celluloid Midas
Backtime				 	
The Eternal Present
Subzero
The Planet of the Daleks
A Stitch in Time
The Enemy From Nowhere
The Ugrakks
Steelfist
Zeron Invasion
Deadly Choice				 	
Who is the Stranger
The Glen of Sleeping
The Threat From Beneath
kcaB to the Sun
The Labyrinth
The Spoilers
The Vortex
The Unheard Voice

TV Action Specials
Fogbound
Secret of the Tower
Doomcloud
Perils of Paris
Who's Who?

TV Action Annuals
The Plant Master
Ride to Nowhere
The Hungry Planet

Doctor Who Magazine
Change of Mind
The Man in the Ion Mask
Target Practice

IDW series
The Forgotten
Prisoners of Time

References

Non-televised Third Doctor stories